= Kezilesu Group =

Geologic formation in China

- Stratigraphic range: Early Cretaceous
- Type: Geological formation
- Unit of: Tarim Basin
- Underlies: Kukebai Formation
- Overlies: Kuzigongsu Formation

Location
- Country: China

The Kezilesu Group is a geological formation in China whose strata date back to the Early Cretaceous. Dinosaur remains are among the fossils that have been recovered from the formation.

== Vertebrate paleofauna ==
- Psittacosaurus sp.

== See also ==
- List of dinosaur-bearing rock formations
